George Simson (1767-1848), of 36 Portland Place and Whitton Park, Middlesex was a politician.

He was a Member (MP) of the Parliament of the United Kingdom for Maidstone 1806 to 1818.

References

1767 births
1848 deaths
People from Marylebone
Members of the Parliament of the United Kingdom for English constituencies
UK MPs 1806–1807
UK MPs 1807–1812
UK MPs 1812–1818